K. R. Chinnarasu was an Indian politician and a Member of Legislative assembly three times. He was elected to Tamil Nadu legislative assembly from Krishnagiri constituency 1977, 1980 and 1984 elections as an Anna Dravida Munnetra Kazhagam candidate.

References 

All India Anna Dravida Munnetra Kazhagam politicians
Living people
Year of birth missing (living people)
Tamil Nadu MLAs 1977–1980
Tamil Nadu MLAs 1980–1984
Tamil Nadu MLAs 1985–1989